The Argentine Military Cemetery,   (Darwin Cemetery), is a military cemetery on East Falkland that holds the remains of 236 Argentine combatants killed during the 1982 Falklands War. It is located at Fish Creek to the east of the Darwin Settlement the location of the Battle of Goose Green.   There is a replica of the cemetery at Berazategui in Buenos Aires Province, Argentina.

History

When the war ended on June 14, 1982, most Argentine bodies were left in temporary graves close to where they fell. Britain offered to send them to Buenos Aires, but the ruling military junta said they were already in their homeland.

In December 1982 the British government commissioned a firm of civilian undertakers under the command of British Army Colonel Geoffrey Cardozo, to consolidate all the temporary Argentine graves on the Islands to a single location. Assisted by the armed forces, they identified and documented each Argentine gravesite and brought the bodies to Port Darwin. As at the time this was the largest single Argentine gravesite, with the bodies of the 47 Argentine soldiers killed at the Battle of Goose Green and buried there soon after the battle.

Many of the bodies collected were without dog-tags, so best efforts were made to identify each soldier from personal effects found on the body.  Single items were not considered conclusive, but collections were. All were given a Christian burial with full military honours.  Each grave is marked by a white wooden cross with the name of the soldier on it, if known, or Soldado Argentino Solo Conocido Por Dios ("Argentine Soldier Known Only By God") if not.

The cemetery is protected by a walled enclosure with a cenotaph including an image of Argentina's patron saint, the Virgen del Lujan. Surrounding the graves, the names of the 649 Argentine soldiers, sailors and airmen who lost their lives in the conflict are inscribed on glass plaques, with no indication of military rank or service, as requested by their families.

Since the end of the conflict the bodies of three more Argentine pilots have been interred:
 Capitán Jorge Osvaldo García successfully ejected from his Argentine Skyhawk after being shot down by a Sea Dart surface-to-air missile on May 25 but was not recovered from the water. His body was found in a dinghy on Golding Island in 1983.
 Lieutenant Miguel Giménez, a Pucará pilot, whose body was found in 1986.  His burial was attended by his family, the first Argentine relatives to visit the Falklands since the end of the war.
 Lieutenant Jorge Casco video, another Skyhawk pilot, who crashed in bad weather on South Jason Island and was buried on 7 March 2009. In the case of Lt. Casco, his family requested that his remains be buried on the Falklands even after they were returned to Argentina in July 2008 for DNA testing in order to confirm his identity.

On 9 November 2002 Prince Andrew, himself a Falklands War Veteran, visited the Argentine cemetery and laid a wreath.  During the visit the Prince said, "I lost friends and colleagues and I know what it must be like for the great many Argentines who have shared the same experience."

Since the UK-Argentine joint statement on 14 July 1999 Argentine families are responsible for the cemetery's upkeep and in 2007, Sebastián Socodo, an Argentine married to a Falkland Islander, was employed to do the job of cemetery maintenance.

Location 

Although the cemetery is referred to as the Cementerio de Darwin (which translates as the Darwin Cemetery) in Argentina, the location is several miles from the Darwin settlement.  The area was known locally as Teal Creek after a house originally constructed nearby.  There are no Argentines interred in the Darwin cemetery which is located in the settlement.

Acts of vandalism

2012 vandalism 
In July 2012 the glass casing protecting a figure of Argentina's patron saint, the Virgin of Luján, at the head of the cemetery was smashed with what appeared to be an axe.  Argentina presented a formal protest to the British government and informed the United Nations and the International Red Cross. Sebastián Socodo, an Argentinian-Falklander responsible for the cemetery's upkeep, said families were notified and that it was not clear when it occurred or who the perpetrators were. Police in the Falklands held an investigation and the glass casing was repaired.

2017 vandalism
A further act of vandalism was found in January 2017, when the glass was broken and the head of the Virgin of Luján statue damaged.
The Argentinian Foreign Ministry made a formal complaint to the British Government condemning the vandalism and calling for an enquiry.
A Falkland Islands Government statement described the act as "distressing for the families (of the soldiers) and regretted by the people of the Falkland Islands" and an enquiry was begun by the Royal Falkland Islands Police. Former British Foreign Minister Sir Alan Duncan offered his apologies to the Argentine Government, welcoming the enquiry.

Identification using DNA
As part of a joint project between the UK, Falkland Islands, Argentine Government and the International Committee of the Red Cross (ICRC), a forensic team exhumed, analyzed and documented the remains in each of the unidentified graves in the Argentine cemetery with this DNA compared to that of surviving family members.  The DNA identification project was co-funded by the UK and Argentine Governments as a humanitarian initiative in line with international law.
On 13 September 2016 a UK-Argentina Joint Communication both countries expressed their full support for a DNA identification process in respect of all unknown Argentine soldiers buried in the Falkland Islands.  The ICRC's multinational 14-member forensic anthropology team began its efforts in June 2017 with samples analyzed in the Argentine Forensic Anthropology Team's laboratory, and scientists in the United Kingdom and Spain confirmed the results of the DNA testing.

By March 2018 the identities of 90 bodies had been confirmed and more than 200 relatives of these soldiers were able to visit the actual grave for the first time.  On March 26, 2018, Argentina's Secretary for Human Rights, Claudio Avruj, accompanied the Argentine families, along with retired British Army colonel Geoffrey Cardozo, who was originally responsible for burying the Argentine dead immediately after the conflict.  The visit included a religious ceremony jointly conducted by Auxiliary Bishop of Buenos Aires, Bishop Eguia Segui, and the Right Reverend Abbott Hugh Allan from the United Kingdom.  Since then, after obtaining more DNA samples from relatives some 115 bodies are now identified and a programme agreed with the UK and Falkland Islands Government aims to identify the remaining 10.

 Repatriation of remains
Lieutenant  was killed on the night of May 29 and interred in the Darwin cemetery at the end of the conflict.  On December 4, 2018 and at the request of his wife María, his remains were repatriated to the Argentine mainland for cremation and reburial in the Sagrado Corazón Parish, Río Cuarto, Córdoba.

See also
 Blue Beach Military Cemetery at San Carlos – which holds the remains of 14 unrepatriated British servicemen
 Falkland Islands sovereignty dispute#Post-war
 Grytviken Cemetery – which holds the remains of Félix Artuso, an Argentinian submarine officer who was killed in the 1982 British recapture of South Georgia from Argentina

References

External links
 
 Clarín:  Interactive panorama with information on the fallen
 Pictorials: Comisión de Familiares, fostlong-photography.com & from the Air
 UK 'regret' over Falklands dead
  Comisión de Familiares de Caídos en Malvinas e Islas del Atlántico Sur – Relatives of the Fallen in the South Atlantic War
 Opening of the Darwin cemetery Memorial
 Argentine families visit graves of newly identified Falklands War dead

1982 establishments in the Falkland Islands
Aftermath of the Falklands War
Cemeteries in the Falkland Islands
Monuments and memorials in the Falkland Islands
Military cemeteries
Military monuments and memorials